WMTY (670 AM) was a radio station licensed to Farragut, Tennessee, United States. The station was last owned by Horne Radio, LLC.

The station went silent on December 20, 2014, and the three towers were taken down in March 2015. On September 24, 2015, Horne Radio surrendered WMTY's license to the Federal Communications Commission (FCC); the FCC cancelled the license and deleted the WMTY call sign on September 30, 2015.

References

External links

MTY
Oldies radio stations in the United States
Knox County, Tennessee
Radio stations established in 1989
1989 establishments in Tennessee
Defunct radio stations in the United States
Radio stations disestablished in 2015
2015 disestablishments in Tennessee
MTY
MTY